Caypullisaurus is an extinct genus of platypterygiine ophthalmosaurid ichthyosaur from the Late Jurassic to the Early Cretaceous (Tithonian and Berriasian stages) of Argentina. Its holotype was collected from the Vaca Muerta Formation of Cerro Lotena, Neuquen, dating to the early Tithonian stage of the Late Jurassic, about 150 million years ago. Caypullisaurus was first named by Marta Fernández in 1997 and the type species is Caypullisaurus bonapartei.

Classification
It is a member of the family Ophthalmosauridae, and closely related to Platypterygius and Brachypterygius. In 2012, Caypullisaurus was found to be most closely related to Athabascasaurus and "Platypterygius" australis, and to nest within the subfamily Platypterygiinae.

Phylogeny
The following cladogram shows a possible phylogenetic position of Caypullisaurus in Ophthalmosauridae according to the analysis performed by Zverkov and Jacobs (2020).

See also 
 List of ichthyosaurs
 Timeline of ichthyosaur research

References 

Early Cretaceous ichthyosaurs
Late Jurassic ichthyosaurs
Berriasian life
Tithonian life
Late Jurassic reptiles of South America
Early Cretaceous reptiles of South America
Cretaceous Argentina
Jurassic Argentina
Fossils of Argentina
Neuquén Basin
Fossil taxa described in 1997
Ophthalmosauridae
Ichthyosauromorph genera